Max Langler was a Mexican film actor who appeared in more than eighty productions during his career.

Selected filmography
 Judas (1936)
 The Sign of Death (1939)
 In the Times of Don Porfirio (1940)
 The Unknown Policeman (1941)
 I'm a Real Mexican (1942)
 The Black Angel (1942)
 Beautiful Michoacán (1943)
 My Memories of Mexico (1944)
 Porfirio Díaz (1944)
 Rosalinda (1945)
 The Flesh Commands (1948)

References

Bibliography
 Rogelio Agrasánchez. Guillermo Calles: A Biography of the Actor and Mexican Cinema Pioneer. McFarland, 2010.

External links

Year of birth missing
Year of death missing
Mexican male film actors